Directorate of Operations may refer to:

Directorate of Operations (DIA)
Directorate of Operations (CIA)